Playmaker Music is an American record label, founded by producer Chadron (“Nitti”) Moore in 2007.  It operates through, and is distributed by, Warner Music Groups’ Warner Bros. Records.

History
On April 4, 2007, Warner Bros. Records announced that it had struck up a label deal with Grammy-nominated producer Chadron (“Nitti”) Moore to launch Playmaker Music.  Under the terms of the deal, WBR will market, promote, and distribute new artists that Nitti (who was previously a staff producer for So So Def Recordings), signs to the label.

Artists
 Mykko Montana
 9th Ward
 PLP (PIPELINE)
 Nicole Wray
 Hamilton Park

See also
 List of record labels

References

Record labels established in 2007
Warner Music labels
American record labels